The 2002 Tour Down Under was the fourth edition of the Tour Down Under stage race. It took place from 15 to 20 January in and around Adelaide, South Australia. This edition was won by Michael Rogers, who rode for Team AIS.

Route

The route of the 2002 Tour Down Under is centred around the city of Adelaide in South Australia. There were six mass-start road stages and no time trials.

Stages

Stage 1
15 January 2002 – Glenelg - Glenelg, 47 km 

Stage and General Classification after Stage 1

References

External links
Jacobs Creek Tour Down Under 2002 report by cyclingnews.com

Tour Down Under
Tour Down Under, 2002
Tour Down Under, 2002
Tour